The Government Victoria College in Palakkad, is the oldest institution of higher learning in the Malabar region of Kerala. It holds a rich educational heritage in the history of malabar region. It is affiliated to the Calicut University and provides undergraduate and postgraduate education in science, arts and commerce subjects.

History

The institution was started in the year 1866 as a Rate School, so called because it depended for its finances upon an educational 'rate' which was at the time levied by Local Government. In 1871 the year in which Local Fund Act came into force and educational rates were abolished, the school was taken over by the Local Fund Board. In 1877 the school became a Government High School and in 1884, it was handed over by the Government to the management of the school. In January 1888 the High School was raised to the rank of a Second Grade College and was affiliated to the University of Madras under the management of Municipal Council, Government undertaking to bear the net cost of the College Department. The Municipal Council resolved to work the institution on the salary-grant-system from 1894.In 1905 the Government declared the college to be self-supporting and discontinued the salary grant.

In 1913 a hostel with furnished accommodation for 100 students was opened. In accordance with the resolution passed at a meeting of Palghat Municipal Council held in December 1917, unanimously requesting th Government to take over the management of the college, the institution was taken over by the Government of Madras Presidency in 1919. The college was raised to First Grade in 1925 with provisions for teaching of History, Philosophy and Mathematics optionals in B.A classes. All classes below Fourth Form were transferred to the control of the Municipal Council, Palakkad in the same year. The High School classes were also transferred in 1933. In 1939 the college was affiliated for the teaching of Mathematics, Physics and Chemistry as main subjects for BSc Degree Examination and Zoology and Electrical Engineering as subsidiary subjects. In 1944 Economics was introduced for B.A and Hindi as part II language in all classes. In 1945 Geography was added  to the optional in the Intermediate and in 1947, Group V Malayalam for the B.A.

As a result of formation of Linguistic Provinces, the college was affiliated to Kerala University in 1957. The college celebrated its centenary on a grant scale in February 1968 based on starting of rate school, again it celebrated its centenary in the year 1989 based on the starting of the college. The college is now affiliated to Calicut University and has been recognized as a Centre of Excellence by the Government of Kerala.

Motto
The motto of the college is the Latin Labunter et imputatur, meaning the moments slip away and are laid to your account.

Notable Alumni 

E. M. S. Namboodiripad, communist politician and first Chief Minister of Kerala
V. R. Krishna Iyer, former Supreme Court judge, former minister
M. T. Vasudevan Nair, Jnanpith Award-winning writer and filmmaker
O. V. Vijayan, author  and cartoonist
T. N. Seshan, former Chief Election Commissioner
E. Sreedharan, civil engineer
Unni Menon, playback singer
K. N. Panikkar, historian
Olappamanna, poet
Ravi Shankar (Cartoonist)
C. N. Jayadevan, ex-MLA & MP
Anil Radhakrishnan Menon, director 
O. Rajagopal, MLA
Mundur Krishnankutty, author
Mankada Ravi Varma, Cinematographer, film director
M.D. Ramanathan, Carnatic Musician

Gallery

See also

References

External links

Official Webpage

 
1866 establishments in India
Educational institutions established in 1866
Arts and Science colleges in Kerala
Colleges affiliated with the University of Calicut
Universities and colleges in Palakkad
Academic institutions formerly affiliated with the University of Madras